Alla Kostyantynivna Cherkasova (born 5 May 1989) is a Ukrainian wrestler. Competing in the 67 kg category, she is the 2010 World bronze medalist and 2012 European silver medalist. She competed in women's freestyle 75 kg at the 2016 Summer Olympics in Rio de Janeiro. She won one of the bronze medals in the women's 68 kg event at the 2020 Summer Olympics held in Tokyo, Japan.

References

External links
 
 
 

1989 births
Living people
Ukrainian female sport wrestlers
Olympic wrestlers of Ukraine
Wrestlers at the 2016 Summer Olympics
Wrestlers at the 2020 Summer Olympics
World Wrestling Championships medalists
European Games medalists in wrestling
European Games bronze medalists for Ukraine
Wrestlers at the 2019 European Games
Sportspeople from Lviv
European Wrestling Championships medalists
Olympic bronze medalists for Ukraine
Olympic medalists in wrestling
Medalists at the 2020 Summer Olympics
21st-century Ukrainian women